Megan Beveridge (born ) is a Scottish soldier who became the first regular army, female "lone piper" at the Royal Edinburgh Military Tattoo. The Lance Bombardier from Burntisland, in Fife was also the first female to pass the army's pipe major course. Aged 21, she is also the youngest person to date to have passed.

Early life and education
Beveridge started playing the bagpipes at the age of nine, after she was inspired by her sister Kerry-Ann who played in The Black Watch Cadets Pipes and Drums. She also played with the cadets as well as the Royal Burgh of Inverkeithing Pipe Band.

Army career
She joined the army after leaving school at the age of 16 and completed a year at the Army Foundation College in Harrogate. She is a member of 19th Regiment Royal Artillery, The Scottish Gunners. She chose the Gunners to improve her prospects as a piper. When she is not piping she is a Transport Junior non-commissioned officer, co-ordinating transport for the day-to-day running of the regiment.

Lone piper
In August 2016, she was chosen to take on the prestigious role of the Lone Piper at the Royal Edinburgh Military Tattoo. She played  the lament 'Sleep Dearie Sleep' on the ramparts of Edinburgh Castle to an 8,800-strong audience.

"It [piping] takes a bit of practice and you need quite a lot of patience - there's a technique to it," she told the BBC who chose her as one of their 100 Women in 2016.

Her ambition is to one day be appointed the Army's senior Pipe Major and eventually become the Sovereign's Piper.

References

Living people
Scottish bagpipe players
Royal Artillery soldiers
People from Burntisland
21st-century British Army personnel
BBC 100 Women
1990s births
21st-century women musicians
British military musicians